Dr. Mohammad Tahir Shah is a professor at the National Centre of Excellence in Geology (NCEG) at the University of Peshawar. He had been selected as the vice-chancellor of the Fata University by the Governor Khyber Pakhtunkhwa Sardar Mahtab Ahmad Khan. He became the director of the NCEG at the University of Peshawar in 2013 and served there for more than 34 years.

Dr. Mohammad Tahir Shah has made contributions to science and technology both nationally and internationally by convening/organizing two international and four national level conferences/workshops and have participated and delivered talks in large number of national and international conferences mainly in the United States, UK, Italy, Austria, China, Bangkok, Sri Lanka, Bangladesh, and Afghanistan.

He remained the principal and co-principal investigator of several national and international projects worth more than 10 million Rs. and also remained the project director of a national-level project.

Shah has carried out extensive geological research in understanding the genesis of the various types of rocks, mineral deposits (especially lead, zinc, copper, and manganese) and gemstones in the northern parts of Pakistan. He supervised an international collaborative project of exploration for source rock for gold and precious metals in the Gilgit-Baltistan region. He has also established state of the art geochemistry laboratory in the National Centre of Excellence in Geology, whereby analysis of rocks, minerals, soil, plants, and water are carried out through sophisticated instruments. The researchers throughout Pakistan acquired geochemical data from this laboratory for their national and international publications. For the last several years he has developed an interest in the environmental problems of the country and has researched in the field of Environmental Geology. Shah has remained a teacher at the University of Peshawar.

Education and life

Mohammad Tahir Shah was born in the village in Sirikot, Ghazil Tehsil, Haripur District, Khyber Pakhtunkhwa  on 20 July 1956. He got his primary education from his village Sirikot, higher secondary education from the Central Model School located in Mianwali in 1972 and intermediate from the Islamia College Peshawar in 1975. He obtained B.Sc. (Hons) Geology in 1978 and MSc Geology from the Department of Geology, the University of Peshawar in 1981. He was appointed as a Research Associate (BS-17)Mohammad Tahir Shah was born in the village in Sirikot, Ghazil Tehsil, Haripur District, Khyber Pakhtunkhwa on 20 July 1956. He got his primary education from his village Sirikot, higher secondary education from the Central Model School located in Mianwali in 1972 and intermediate from the Islamia College Peshawar in 1975. He obtained B.Sc. (Hons) Geology in 1978 and MSc Geology from the Department of Geology, the University of Peshawar in 1981. He was appointed as a Research Associate (BS-17) in the National Centre of Excellence in Geology, University of Peshawar in 1982. In 1986, he received the first M.Phil. degree in Geology from the University of Peshawar. Shah won the Thomas Jefferson Ph.D. scholarship and proceeded to the University of South Carolina, Columbia (USA) in 1987 and returned to Pakistan, after completing his Ph.D., in 1991. He was promoted to assistant professor (1992–1995), associate professor (1995–2002), professor (2009), and tenured professor (2009–2016).

Academic career

In recognition of Shah's research contributions in the field of earth and environmental sciences, the President of Pakistan awarded him Civil Award (Tamgha-e-Imtiaz) in the field of science on the eve of 14 August 2014. He was also awarded the Presidential Award (Izaz-I-Fazeelat) on the eve of 14 August 2001. He is the recipient of the Gold Medal of the Pakistan Academy of Sciences for his research in 2005. The Pakistan Book Foundation awarded him the Earth Scientist of the year award for his publications in the Earth Sciences in the year 1994–95. He was also awarded IUCN 2001 Environmental award in Academia by SPCS, Khyber Pakhtunkhwa. He has been awarded Productivity Awards on his international papers for the years 2003–2005 and 2009–2013. He is listed in the directory Productive Scientists of Pakistan published by the Pakistan Council of Science and Technology, Islamabad in 2011–2014. He has also received the Star Laureate award and Zafar H. Zaidi Gold Medal for the year 2006 by the South Asia Publications (SAP) in recognition of his credentials par excellence in the field of education.

Shah has been and is a member of the boards of studies of various universities, including the University of Peshawar, University of Haripur, Benazir Women University, Quaid-i-Azam University, University of Sargodha, AJK University, University of Poonch, and COMSAT Institute of IT, Abbottabad, and Islamabad. He is a member of the Board of Faculty of the University of Swabi, the Board of Directors of the Khyber Pakhtunkhwa Oil and Gas Company (Ltd) and the Board of Governors of the Centre of Excellence in Mineralogy, University of Baluchistan. Shah remained a member of the Ph.D. Review Committee and the National Curriculum Revision Committee of the HEC, Islamabad. He is the chief-editor of the HEC recognized Journal of Himalayan Earth Sciences and also remained the Sub-Editor of the Journal of Science & Technology, University of Peshawar. Shah has also won the prestigious Fulbright (1999–2000) and Commonwealth (2000–2001) Post-Doctoral fellowships and has carried out Post-Doctoral research at the University of Nevada, Reno, Nevada, U.S., and University of Leicester, UK, respectively. He remained the senior vice president of the National Geological Society of Pakistan (2006–2008).

References

1956 births
Living people
Alumni of the University of Leicester
Academic staff of FATA University
Islamia College University alumni
Pakistani geologists
People from Haripur District
University of Nevada alumni
University of Peshawar alumni
Academic staff of the University of Peshawar
University of South Carolina alumni